Perivolia Municipal Stadium is a multi-purpose stadium in Mournies, Chania, Greece.

From the 2012-2013 season, Platanias FC were based at Perivolia Municipal Stadium, which led to extensive upgrading and modernization work at all levels during the summer of 2012, to meet in full all obligations set by the organizing principle of the Greek Super League.

Since then, the Municipal stadium has "transformed" into a modern football stadium, with two tiers (one of them covered), journalists bays, brand-new change rooms for athletes and referees (female assistants have separate changing rooms), clinic, gym, comfortable offices for observers, room for press conferences, and other facilities. 

Platanias FC spent  6 years in the top tier Greek Super League from 2012-2013 until their relegation after 2017-2018.

From the 2017-2018 season, Chania FC are also based at Perivolia Municipal Stadium following the merger of AO Chania and PGS Kissamikos.

Chania FC is now the sole representative for the Chania region following the dissolution of Platanias FC in 2021.

References
 ″Chania, Mournies (2012) Perivolia Stadium″

External links
 

Football venues in Greece
Multi-purpose stadiums in Greece
Buildings and structures in Chania (regional unit)
Sports venues in Crete
Platanias F.C.